Ian McCrea (born 12 June 1976) is a Unionist politician from Northern Ireland, representing the Democratic Unionist Party (DUP). He was elected in 2007 as a Northern Ireland Assembly member for Mid Ulster, and lost his seat in the 2016 Assembly election.

Born in Magherafelt in 1976, he now lives in Cookstown with his wife and three children. McCrea is the son of Lord McCrea of Magherafelt and Cookstown.

McCrea was elected to Cookstown District Council in 2001, held the position of chairman of the Council in 2007–08 and is a member of Cookstown District Policing Partnership.

A former member of the Young Democrats, McCrea is now chairman of the Cookstown DUP Branch, and of the party's Local Government Association, also in Cookstown. A member of the Apprentice Boys of Derry, he also acts as chairman of Coagh United Supporters Club.

In 2011 his car was set alight and destroyed outside his house; no group or individual admitted responsibility for the attack.

McCrea caused controversy by commenting on his Twitter page in 2012 that he would like no GAA county team from his constituency to win any titles that summer, saying, "Great to see Tyrone beat in the Ulster semis today, hope Donegal beat Derry in the final to keep the celebrations out of Mid Ulster."

References

External links
McCrea's website
Belfast Today article

1976 births
Living people
Democratic Unionist Party MLAs
Northern Ireland MLAs 2007–2011
Northern Ireland MLAs 2011–2016
Members of Cookstown District Council
People from Magherafelt
People from County Tyrone
Sons of life peers